Warriors is a British television drama serial, written by Leigh Jackson, produced by Nigel Stafford-Clark and directed by Peter Kosminsky. It starred Matthew Macfadyen, Damian Lewis and Ioan Gruffudd. It was screened on BBC One on 20 and 21 November 1999. The serial tells the story of a group of British peacekeepers serving in a peacekeeping operation of the UNPROFOR in Vitez, in Bosnia during the Lašva Valley ethnic cleansing in 1993. The serial was released on VHS on 29 November 1999. On 7 January 2004 the serial was issued on DVD in the Netherlands.

The film emphasises the contradictions of the mandate of the peacekeepers, and the psychological trauma that they sustain while being forced to observe atrocities perpetrated against civilians without being able to intervene, and being subject to deliberate provocations against which they are unable to retaliate. The ironic title of the programme is taken from the name of the armoured vehicle used by the British forces, the FV 510 Warrior. Music for the serial was written by Debbie Wiseman. When it aired in the United States, the serial was re-titled Peacekeepers.

Cast
 Ioan Gruffudd as Lieutenant (later Captain) John Feeley 
 Matthew Macfadyen as Private Alan James
 Damian Lewis as Lieutenant Neil Loughrey 
 Cal Macaninch as Sergeant Andre Sochanik 
 Darren Morfitt as Private Peter Skeet 
 Shaun Dooley as Private John Hookway 
 Tom Ward as Captain Richard Gurney 
 Joe Renton as Corporal Gary Sprague
 Ifan Meredith as Lieutenant Jonathan Engel 
 Simon Shepherd as Major 'Brick' Stone 
 Steve Chaplin as Private Tommy Redmond
 Greg Chisholm as Private Martin Rook
 Jodhi May as Emma
 Predrag Bjelac as Naser Zec 
 Branka Katić as Almira Zec 
 Carsten Voigt as Rik Langrubber 
 Sheyla Shehovich as Minka
 Elizabeth Lovelady as Sandra Skeet 
 Zaim Muzaferija as Imam

Awards
British Academy Television Awards
 Best Drama Serial
 Best Sound
 Best Design (nominated)
 Best Photography and Lighting (nominated)
 Biarritz International Festival of Audiovisual Programming, Golden FIPA
 Broadcasting Press Guild Awards, Broadcasting Press Guild Award, Best Single Drama
 Monte-Carlo TV Festival, Golden Nymph, Mini-Series - Best Mini-Series
 Prix Italia, Fiction, 2000
 Royal Television Society, UK, RTS Television Award
 Best Single Drama 
 Best Costume Design
 Best Music – Original Score
 Best Sound – Drama 
 Best Production Design – Drama (nominated)
 Best Actor – Male (nominated)
 Best Writer (nominated)

Sources and references

External links
 

1999 British television series debuts
1999 British television series endings
1990s British drama television series
BAFTA winners (television series)
BBC television dramas
1990s British television miniseries
Films directed by Peter Kosminsky
Bosnian War films
Prix Italia winners
Yugoslav Wars in fiction
English-language television shows
Military television series